Amanda Carpenter (born November 20, 1982) is an American author, political advisor, and speechwriter. She is a former senior staffer to Senators Jim DeMint and Ted Cruz. She was a columnist for The Washington Times from 2009 to 2010 and regularly appears as a political contributor on CNN.

Early life and education
Carpenter grew up in Montrose, Michigan. She graduated from Ball State University with a B.A. in Communication Studies in 2005.

Career in media and politics 
Carpenter worked as a congressional correspondent for Human Events from 2005 to 2007 before going to Townhall.com to become its national political reporter.

In March 2009, Carpenter took a position with The Washington Times, where she wrote a daily column called the Hot Button that covered political and cultural issues as well other news articles.

In early 2010, Carpenter left The Washington Times and joined Senator Jim DeMint's staff as senior communications advisor and speechwriter.

In January 2013, Carpenter became senior communications advisor and speechwriter for Senator Ted Cruz.

In July 2015, Carpenter returned to her journalism career. She is a contributor for CNN. She is known for critiquing President Trump, in particular his treatment of women. Carpenter has said that she agrees with some of his policy decisions, but that the scandals surrounding his presidency make it "very difficult" to defend him. In her 2018 book Gaslighting America: Why We Love It When Trump Lies to Us, she critiques Trump's propensity for lying.

Carpenter is also known as a blogger, author, and commentator. She has made numerous media appearances, including segments on the BBC; Fox News's The O'Reilly Factor, Red Eye w/ Greg Gutfeld, Hannity & Colmes, and The Big Story; MSNBC's Tucker; PBS's To the Contrary and CNN's Larry King Live and Reliable Sources. Her book The Vast Right-Wing Conspiracy's Dossier on Hillary Rodham Clinton was published in 2006. She later wrote about the 2008 presidential election for Glamour magazine's blog "Glamocracy."

Carpenter is a Republican.

Publications

See also
 Vast right-wing conspiracy
 Veracity of statements by Donald Trump

References

External links 

 
 
 Articles by Amanda Carpenter on Townhall
 Video discussions in which Amanda Carpenter has taken part via Bloggingheads.tv

1982 births
American women bloggers
American bloggers
American women columnists
American political writers
Television personalities from Michigan
American women television personalities
Ball State University alumni
Human Events people
The Washington Times people
People from Genesee County, Michigan
Living people
21st-century American journalists
21st-century American women writers
Journalists from Michigan
CNN people
Ted Cruz
Michigan Republicans